Bangladeshi New Zealanders refers to New Zealand citizens or residents who have full or partial Bangladeshi heritage or people who emigrated from Bangladesh and reside in New Zealand. There are around 1,623 Bangladeshis in New Zealand, according to the census in 2013. The largest Bangladeshi communities are mainly present in Auckland with smaller communities in other cities.

History
Bangladeshis are relatively new migrants to New Zealand. Since 1970, migration from Bangladesh has steadily increased with the majority arriving under the Skilled Migration Program. Most Bangladesh-born have settled in the urban areas of Auckland while smaller numbers settled in other cities.

Geographic distribution

2013 census
The latest census in 2013 recorded 1,623 Bangladesh-descent people in New Zealand.

See also

 Immigration to New Zealand

References

External links
 GaanBaksho NZ (Bangladeshi community portal in New Zealand & Australia)

Asian New Zealander
 
Bangladeshi diaspora